Sally Grace (born 10 September 1951) is an English actress who has worked extensively on radio and television and in animation.

Life and career
Grace was born in Harrogate, North Yorkshire, England, and trained at the Guildhall School of Music and Drama.

She was a member of the team on Week Ending, the BBC Radio 4 topical satirical sketch show, where she was the voice of Margaret Thatcher from 1983 onwards, remaining until the series ended in 1998.

Her work with Ken Bruce on Radio 2's What If Show led The Independent on Sunday to describe her as "the best impressionist in the business".

She voiced the part of Elena in BBC Radio 4's adaptions of Dirk Gently's Holistic Detective Agency and The Long Dark Tea-Time of the Soul. Her animation roles include the voices of pompous Owl, loud Weasel, and demure but strong-willed Charmer in the popular TV series The Animals of Farthing Wood. She lent her voice to the series Noah's Island, Mr. Bean: The Animated Series, Dennis the Menace, Pongwiffy, Rudi and Trudi, Space Island One, Never the Twain, Solo, The Big One, Aaagh! It's the Mr. Hell Show!, Badly Dubbed Porn, Bedtime, Doubletake and Spaced and the animated short Bob's Birthday.

Other TV credits include Why Didn't They Ask Evans?, Sorry! ("Does Your Mother Know You're Out?"), Raffles ("The First Step"), The Ruth Rendell Mysteries ("From Doon With Death"), and Oh, Doctor Beeching! ("Past Love"); she also featured in some episodes of Coronation Street. Later acting roles were as the Queen in Alistair McGowan's sketches about the royal family, and as Betty Marsden in a touring stage adaptation of Round the Horne. Her film credits include Ghost Story (1974) and Boston Kickout (1995).

References

External links
 

1951 births
Living people
20th-century English actresses
21st-century English actresses
Actresses from Yorkshire
English film actresses
English satirists
English television actresses
English voice actresses
People from Harrogate
Women satirists
Alumni of the Guildhall School of Music and Drama